The Puerto Rico Commission on Safety and Public Protection is the government agency of the executive branch of the government of Puerto Rico that coordinates, manages, and oversees all the public safety agencies and related private organizations in Puerto Rico. The Commission is composed by the Adjutant General, the Fire Chief, the Police Superintendent, and the Director of the State Agency for Emergency and Disaster Management, with one of the aforementioned officers presiding it as the Commissioner of Safety and Public Protection.

Background
In 1993, the Governor of Puerto Rico through an executive order created the Puerto Rico Safety Council to oversee all matters related to public safety within Puerto Rico. Since its creation the Council was considered highly effective; however, at that time the Council was led by the Governor and required his continued presence so that the Council could operate effectively. This had the consequence of subtracting time from the Governor to focus on other areas of public administration. Because of this, the government created the Commission on Safety and Public Protection with broad powers so that the Commission, rather than the Governor, could implement, manage, coordinate, and oversee all public policy related to public safety in Puerto Rico. On April 10, 2017, governor Ricardo Rosselló disbanded the agency by signing Law 20, Law of the Puerto Rico Department of Public Safety, which absorbed all agencies.

Agencies

 Criminal Justice College
 Firefighters Corps
 Government Board of the 9-1-1 System
 National Guard
 Police
 State Agency for Emergency and Disaster Management

References

 
Secretariat of Governance of Puerto Rico
Government agencies established in 1993
1993 establishments in Puerto Rico